The London Film Critics' Circle Award for Technical Achievement of the Year in an annual award given by the London Film Critics' Circle.

Winners

2010s

2020s

References 

F